Rafaelson Bezerra Fernandes (born 30 March 1997), simply known as Rafaelson, is a Brazilian professional footballer who plays as a forward for V.League 1 club Topenland Bình Định.

Club career
A Vitória youth graduate, Rafaelson was accused of having an illegal age in April 2015, a claim which was later dismissed by the club. He was promoted to the first team in September, by manager Vágner Mancini.

Rafaelson made his professional debut on 5 September 2015, coming on as a second-half substitute for Robert in a 1–2 home loss against Botafogo for the Série B championship. His first goal came on 31 October, netting the last in a 2–3 home loss against Náutico. He contributed with seven appearances during the campaign, as his side achieved promotion to Série A.

On 30 June 2016 Rafaelson made his top tier debut, replacing Tiago Real in a 3–2 home win against Sport.

On 13 April 2019 Rafaelson moved to Denmark and joined Næstved BK. Næstved announced on 12 January 2020, that they had sold Rafaelson to Duoc Nam Ha Nam Dinh in the V.League 1.

Honours

Club
Vitória
Campeonato Baiano: 2016

	Topenland Bình Định
V.League 1:
 Third place: 2022
Vietnamese National Cup:
 Runners-up: 2022

References

External links

1997 births
Living people
Sportspeople from Maranhão
Brazilian footballers
Brazilian expatriate footballers
Association football forwards
Campeonato Brasileiro Série A players
Campeonato Brasileiro Série B players
Danish 1st Division players
Esporte Clube Vitória players
Vegalta Sendai players
Næstved Boldklub players
Nam Định F.C. players
Brazilian expatriate sportspeople in Japan
Brazilian expatriate sportspeople in Denmark
Brazilian expatriate sportspeople in Vietnam
Expatriate footballers in Japan
Expatriate men's footballers in Denmark
Expatriate footballers in Vietnam